John Clifford Folger (May 28, 1893March 24, 1981) was an American diplomat who served as the United States Ambassador to Belgium from 1957 to 1959.

Early life
Folger was born on May 28, 1893, in Sheldon, Iowa.

Career
Folger was appointed by President Dwight D. Eisenhower to the position of United States Ambassador to Belgium on March 28, 1957. The presentation of his credentials occurred on May 24, 1957. The termination of mission occurred on September 11, 1959.

Personal life
Folger was Episcopalian.

Death
Folger died on March 24, 1981, in Washington, D.C. He is interred at Washington National Cathedral.

References

1893 births
1981 deaths
Ambassadors of the United States to Belgium
Episcopalians from Iowa
19th-century American Episcopalians
20th-century American Episcopalians
20th-century American diplomats
Burials at Washington National Cathedral